Audi Crooks is an American high school basketball player who attends Bishop Garrigan High School in Algona, Iowa. She plays the center position.

High school career
Crooks attends Bishop Garrigan High School in Algona, Iowa. As a freshman, she broke state freshman records in points scored (626) and field goals made (270) while helping Bishop Garrigan achieve a 25–2 record. Crooks also set a new school record for single-season field goal percentage (70.7), which was previously held by her mother. Crooks scored a season-high 40 points in a 73–33 win over Humboldt, shooting 17-for-23 from the field. At the Class 1A state tournament, Crooks was named team captain of the all-tournament team after averaging 25.3 points and 15 rebounds per game. Bishop Garrigan lost the title game against two-time defending champions Newell-Fonda, with Crooks recording 34 points and 17 rebounds in the defeat. She was ultimately named Class 1A Player of the Year and first-team all-state. Crooks and Molly Joyce were the first pair of freshman teammates in state history to make the all-state first-team.

As a sophomore, Crooks averaged 20.7 points, 10.6 rebounds, and 4.0 blocks per game, leading the Golden Bears to another 25–2 record. She led the state in made field goals (224) while shooting 70.4 percent from the field, once again earning first-team all-state honors. Bishop Garrigan entered the state tournament as the top seed but lost to Newell-Fonda again in the final, with Crooks adding 25 points and 10 rebounds in the championship game. As a junior, Crooks recorded 23.5 points, 12.5 rebounds and 3.3 blocks per game while shooting 72.2 percent from the field. She also scored a school-record 44 points in a win over North Union. Crooks earned first-team all-state honors for the third consecutive year after leading Bishop Garrigan to a 25–3 record and its first-ever class 1A state title. She recorded 15 points and 13 rebounds in the title game against MMCRU, becoming the state tournament's all-time leading rebounder in only nine games. Crooks was named the Iowa female athlete of the year by The Des Moines Register.

Crooks competes on the Amateur Athletic Union (AAU) circuit for CY Select Wolves. Aside from basketball, she competes in track and field, winning the Class 1A state title in shot put as a sophomore after her freshman season was canceled due to the COVID-19 pandemic. Crooks repeated the feat as a junior, breaking the Class 1A record with a throw of 45 ft 1 in. She also plays volleyball, earning first-team all-conference honors as a junior.

Recruiting
Crooks is rated as a four-star recruit and is considered among the best high school prospects of the 2023 class. She is ranked as the no. 42 overall recruit by Prep Girls Hoops, as well as no. 58 by ESPN.

She received her first Division I offer from Illinois State in July 2020. By that September she had received offers from all four Division I programs in Iowa (Iowa, Iowa State, Northern Iowa, and Drake) as well as Maryland. The following year, Crooks received offers from Minnesota, Michigan, Wisconsin, Kansas, Ole Miss, Penn State and Oklahoma. She committed to Iowa State on April 14, 2022.

Personal life
Crooks comes from an athletic family. Her father, Jimmie Crooks, starred at Fort Dodge Senior High School before playing college basketball at Mankato State and Southern Nazarene. He died in 2021. Her mother, Michelle Cook, is one of the all-time leading scorers for the Bishop Garrigan basketball team. Her uncle, Matt Vitzthum, is the offensive coordinator and quarterbacks coach at Grand Valley State.

Outside of sports, Crooks participates in jazz choir and plays trumpet in the school band.

References

Living people
American women's basketball players
Centers (basketball)
Basketball players from Iowa
Year of birth missing (living people)